Fox Glacier, called Weheka until the 1940s, is a village on the West Coast of the South Island of New Zealand. The village is close to the eponymous Fox Glacier / Te Moeka o Tuawe.

Location

Fox Glacier is primarily a service centre for tourists, although it also services the local farming community. The village is served by the Fox Glacier Aerodrome.

Name
The village was known as Weheka until the 1940s, when the name of the post office was changed to Fox Glacier, after the nearby glacier of the same name. The glacier was given the name of Fox Glacier in 1872 after a visit by then New Zealand premier, William Fox.

History 
At that time, Gillespies was briefly the third-largest town on the West Coast. As the amount of gold being recovered declined, most of the population, including the Sullivan family of miners, moved on. Patrick Sullivan moved inland with his friend Fred Williams to try farming in an area known as the Weheka Valley. Julia Sullivan married Fred Williams in 1893 and built a farmhouse on the Cook River flats near the present site of the settlement. By the early 1900s large amounts of forest on the flats had been cleared and become farmland.

Access to the settlement was still via the sea: boats would land at Gillespies Beach, and goods were unloaded in the surf and carried by horse and dray back to Weheka. The road north to Waiho (now Franz Josef / Waiau) was very poor: surveyor Charlie Douglas wrote in the 1890s, "…when I came through that way, I left the track and took to the bush as being far better walking." By 1903 it had been improved and Dr Ebenezer Teichelmann described it as a good horse track.
In the 1920s Westland began to be marketed as a scenic wonderland for tourists. For years the Williams and Sullivan families had offered hospitality to tourists coming to see the glacier in their own homesteads, but in 1926 Mick and Jack Sullivan decided to build accommodation for the increasing numbers of visitors. They established a sawmill and built the Fox Glacier Hostel, which opened on 20 December 1928. It had its own hydroelectric power generator and was supplied by the Sullivan farm. It had 40 bedrooms, designed to accommodate up to 100 guests, as well as four parlours and a large dining room for up to 70 diners.

The hotel became the centre of activity in the area, running trips to Lake Matheson where visitors could take a boat to photograph the lakes famous reflections. Horses were supplied to tourists who wanted to visit the remains of the gold-mining settlement at Gillespies Beach. Mary Kerr (née Sullivan) ran the hotel, and essentially all local tourism, from the 1950s until her death in 1986.

Demographics 

The Fox Glacier settlement had a usual resident population of 249 at the 2018 New Zealand census, an increase of 15 people (6.4%) since the 2013 census, and a decrease of 36 people (−12.6%) since the 2006 census. There were 126 males and 123 females, giving a sex ratio of 1.02 males per female. Of the total population, 18 people (7.2%) were aged up to 15 years, 90 (36.1%) were 15 to 29, 123 (49.4%) were 30 to 64, and 12 (4.8%) were 65 or older.

Ethnicities were 61.4% European/Pākehā, 2.4% Māori, 6.0% Pacific peoples, 24.1% Asian, and 7.2% other ethnicities (totals add to more than 100% since people could identify with multiple ethnicities).

Churches

Our Lady of the Snows

Our Lady of the Snows is a Catholic church located at 60 Cook Flat Road, Fox Glacier, within the South Westland parish of Our Lady of the Woods. The wooden church was built in three months, at a cost of £690, by Robert Emmett Clarke of Whataroa, and includes stained-glass windows and statues donated by settlers in the area in memory of deceased relatives. The Bishop of Christchurch, Matthew Brodie, laid the foundation stone on 22 April 1934, and the church was blessed and dedicated on 15 September 1935 by Bishop Brodie.

Mass is held at Our Lady of the Snows twice monthly, on the second and fourth Sundays.

Douglas Memorial Church

The Douglas Memorial Church was a small Presbyterian church at 5 Main Road, Fox Glacier, built by the Hokitika firm of Goodfellow and Bennett in 1952 from local stone and rimu. A reduction in the number of parishioners saw the church put up for sale in 2012, and it was subsequently converted into self-catering holiday accommodation, The Church at Fox, opening in 2015.

The church was named in honour of the Reverend William Douglas (–1920), who was the Presbyterian minister in Hokitika between 1881 and 1907, and served as moderator of the General Assembly in New Zealand in 1882.

Education

Fox Glacier School is the sole school in Fox Glacier, serving approximately  students from Years 1 to 8 (ages 5 to 12). The school was established in 1877.

References

Westland District
Populated places in the West Coast, New Zealand